Alioune Sow (born 19 February 1936) is a Senegalese sprinter. He competed in the men's 200 metres at the 1964 Summer Olympics.

References

1936 births
Living people
Athletes (track and field) at the 1964 Summer Olympics
Senegalese male sprinters
Olympic athletes of Senegal
Place of birth missing (living people)